Ruslan Imankulov (born 2 February 1972) is a retired Kazakh footballer who played as a forward.

Career
Imankulov spent most of his career playing for FC Shakhter Karagandy, for whom he scored 99 goals over 14 seasons, the fourth most in the history of the Kazakhstan Premier League.

International career
Imankulov made three appearances for the Kazakhstan, making his debut on 27 December 1995 against Kuwait, scoring one goal.

International goals

References

External links

1972 births
Living people
Kazakhstani footballers
Kazakhstan international footballers
Kazakhstan Premier League players
FC Shakhter Karagandy players
Association football forwards